Sudhakaran may refer to: 

G. Sudhakaran minister in Government of Kerala 
K. Sudhakaran a Member of Parliament.